Alberto "Beto" Navarro (born March 25, 1989) is an American soccer player. He currently serves on the coaching staff for California United Strikers FC in the National Independent Soccer Association.

Career

In 2012, Navarro was a part of Cal FC's improbable U.S. Open Cup run that saw them defeat the USL's Wilmington Hammerheads and Major League Soccer's Portland Timbers before falling to Seattle Sounders FC in the fourth round. Navarro followed coach Eric Wynalda to Atlanta to join the NASL's Atlanta Silverbacks soon after.

Navarro returned to his native California for the 2015 USL season, joining the Orange County Blues.

On December 17, 2015, Navarro re-joined the NASL by signing a contract with Jacksonville Armada FC.

On August 13, 2019, Navarro signed with California United Strikers FC ahead of its inaugural season in the National Independent Soccer Association.

Honors
Atlanta Silverbacks FC
Spring Season Champions: 2013

Orange County Blues FC
USL Team of the Week: 2015 Week 22
Western Conference Regular Season Champions: 2015

California United Strikers	FC
West Coast Conference Champions: 2019

References

External links
 Atlanta Silverbacks bio
 Cal State Bakersfield bio
 

1989 births
Living people
American soccer players
Cal State Bakersfield Roadrunners men's soccer players
Fresno Fuego players
Cal FC players
Atlanta Silverbacks players
FC Edmonton players
Jacksonville Armada FC players
Orange County SC players
Fresno FC players
California United Strikers FC players
USL League Two players
North American Soccer League players
USL Championship players
National Independent Soccer Association players
Association football defenders
People from Delano, California